The 2016 League of Ireland First Division season was the 32nd season of the League of Ireland First Division.

On 28 August, Limerick clinched the title and promotion after a 3–2 win away to UCD.

Overview
The First Division has 8 teams. Each team played each other four times, twice at home and twice away, for a total of 28 matches in the season.

The eight clubs competed for a prize fund of €104,000 with the winners receiving €30,000 and the eighth placed team collecting €8,000.

Teams

Personnel and kits

Note: Flags indicate national team as has been defined under FIFA eligibility rules. Players may hold more than one non-FIFA nationality.

League table

Results

Matches 1–14
Teams played each other twice (once at home, once away)

Matches 15–28
Teams played each other twice (once at home, once away)

Promotion/relegation playoffs

First Division 

Drogheda United advanced to the promotion/relegation play-offs against Wexford Youths.

First Division vs Premier Division  

Drogheda United are promoted to the 2017 Premier Division; Wexford Youths are relegated to the 2017 First Division.

See also
 2016 League of Ireland Premier Division
 2016 League of Ireland Cup

References

 
League of Ireland First Division seasons
2016 League of Ireland
2016 in Republic of Ireland association football leagues
Ireland
Ireland